Triathlon for both men and women were contested on December 8 at the 2006 Asian Games in Doha, Qatar.  Both men and women competed on the Corniche Triathlon Course. This is the first Asian Games for the Triathlon event. The course features a 1,500 meters swim, a 40 kilometers bike ride, and a 10 kilometers run.

Schedule

Medalists

Medal table

Participating nations
A total of 43 athletes from 15 nations competed in triathlon at the 2006 Asian Games:

References 
2006 Results

External links
 

 
2006
2006 Asian Games events
Asian Games